Frank Marchlewski (October 14, 1943 – October 27, 2016) was a professional American football player who played offensive lineman for six seasons for the Los Angeles Rams, Atlanta Falcons, and Buffalo Bills.

Buffalo Bills
As a member of the Bills in his final year (1970), he became their starting center, replacing Al Bemiller. However, the Bills fielded a poor team that year, with a record of 3-10-1, scoring only 204 points (14.6 points/game), 23rd of 26 teams in the NFL, despite the presence of second year pro O. J. Simpson in the backfield, who only rushed for 488 yards. The following year, Marchlewski was replaced by rookie Bruce Jarvis. He died on October 27, 2016 from heart problems, aged 73.

References

1943 births
American football offensive linemen
Los Angeles Rams players
Atlanta Falcons players
Buffalo Bills players
Minnesota Golden Gophers football players
2016 deaths
People from New Kensington, Pennsylvania
Players of American football from Pennsylvania
Sportspeople from the Pittsburgh metropolitan area